Marcos Antonio Orellana (1731–1813) was a Spanish erudite, jurist and writer.

Works (in Spanish)
 Valencia antigua y moderna. Historia y descripción de las calles, plazas y edificios de Valencia. No se publicó hasta 1923.
 Catálogo y descripció dels pardals de l' Albufera de València. (sic). (1795).
 Catálogo dels peixos qu'es crien e peixquen en lo mar de València. (sic). (1802).
 Biografía pictórica valentina, o vida de los pintores, arquitectos, escultores y grabadores valencianos. Esta obra la escrita basándose en informaciones directas.
 Historia lúdica, o tratado de los juegos antiguos y modernos, y otras diversiones usadas en varias partes, particularmente en la Ciudad y Reino de Valencia.
 Tratado de la monedas de España y que han corrido en la corona de Aragón, especialmente en Valencia.
 El escudo verdadero antiguo de Valencia: el Dragón.
 Memoria sobre los guadamaciles valencianos.
 Noticia de los instrumentos músicos que se usaban en el Reino de Valencia.
 Memoria sobre los vidrios pintados y modo de crear esta industria en Valencia.
 Noticia sobre la fabricación del azúcar e ingenios que en lo antiguo se conocieron en el Reino de Valencia.
 Efemérides de Valencia.
 Historia del Santo Cáliz.
 Se sabe que fue autor de poemas en lengua autóctona, así como de una compilación de adagios, obras actualmente perdidas.

Writers from the Valencian Community
People from Valencia
1731 births
1813 deaths